LibreCMC is a Linux-libre distribution for computers with minimal resources, such as the Ben NanoNote, ath9k-based Wi-Fi routers, and other hardware with emphasis on free software. Based on OpenWrt, the project's goal is to aim for compliance with the GNU Free System Distribution Guidelines (GNU FSDG) and ensure that the project continues to meet these requirements set forth by the Free Software Foundation (FSF). LibreCMC does not support ac (Wi-Fi 5) or ax (Wi-Fi 6) due to a lack of free chipsets.

As of 2020, releases do not utilize codenames anymore. The acronym "CMC" in the libreCMC name stands for "Concurrent Machine Cluster".



History 
On April 23, 2014, libreCMC's first public release is mentioned in a Trisquel Linux forum. On September 4, 2014, the Free Software Foundation (FSF) added libreCMC to its list of endorsed distributions. Shortly afterwards, on September 12, 2014, the FSF awarded their Respects Your Freedom (RYF) Certification to a new router pre-installed with libreCMC.

On May 2, 2015, libreCMC merged with the LibreWRT project. LibreWRT, initially developed as a case study, was listed by the website prism-break.org as one of the alternatives to proprietary firmware, but today the website lists libreCMC.

On March 10, 2016, the FSF awarded their RYF certification to a new router pre-installed with libreCMC.

On March 29, 2017, libreCMC began its first release based upon the LEDE (Linux Embedded Development Environment) 17.01 codebase.

On January 3, 2020, libreCMC began its first release based upon the OpenWrt 19.07 codebase.

Release history 

 Source

List of supported hardware 

LibreCMC supports the following devices:

Buffalo (Melco subsidiary)
 WZR-HP-G300NH
 WHR-HP-G300NH
Netgear
 WNDR3800: v1.x
TP-Link
 TL-MR3020: v1
 TL-WR741ND: v1 - v2, v4.20 - v4.27
 TL-WR841ND: v5.x, v8.x, v9.x, v10.x, v11.x, v12.x
 TL-WR842ND: v1, v2
 TL-WR1043ND: v1.x, v2.x, v3.x, v4.x, v5.x

ThinkPenguin
 TPE-NWIFIROUTER2
 TPE-R1100
 TPE-R1200
 TPE-R1300

Qi-Hardware
 Ben Nanonote

See also 

 Comparison of Linux distributions
 Linksys WRT54G series
 List of router firmware projects

References

External links 

 
LibreCMC package installation tutorial

Build automation
Custom firmware
Embedded Linux
Embedded Linux distributions
Free routing software
Free software only Linux distributions
Homebrew software
Wi-Fi
Linux distributions without systemd
Linux distributions